Ethmia lepidella is a moth in the family Depressariidae. It is found in Algeria, Tunisia, Libya, the Palestinian Territories, the United Arab Emirates, Turkey and Spain.

The larvae have been recorded feeding on Echium humile and Anchusa hispida.

References

Moths described in 1907
lepidella